Crazy Recipe Adventure was a South Korean cooking-variety show on MBC. It aired on MBC starting from January 15, 2021 on Fridays at 20:45 (KST). The show aired two pilot episodes as an MBC Chuseok special in 2020. The final episode was broadcast on June 4, 2021.

Format 
Each episode consists of a Korean food theme. Guests will then cook their own recipes which will be presented anonymously to the cast in the order the guest chooses. If the cast member likes the dish, a golden axe is shown and the dish can be tasted by the next person. However if the cast member dislikes the dish, a toad is shown and the dish is eliminated preventing the next person from tasting it. If the cast unanimously approves of the dish the guest will receive an 11.25 gram pure gold axe.

Production

On August 21, 2020, South Korean entertainment company Mystic Story announced a new pilot called Crazy Noodle Recipe directed by Yoo Woon-hyuk and airing on MBC. The show starred Kim Jong-kook, Haha, Seo Jang-hoon, Sung Si-kyung and Ham Yeon-ji. The format of the show consisted of the cast visiting people who claimed to have a unique ramen recipe, watching them cook, then eating and judging their recipe. If the cast unanimously approves the dish, the contestant is awarded $1000 USD to help further develop their recipe. The show was broadcast in two parts by MBC as a Chuseok special on September 29 and 30 with favourable support from the viewers.

On December 28, 2020, MBC confirmed that the show was approved for regular broadcasting but would go through a format overhaul. The show was renamed to Crazy Recipe Adventure and the format was changed to a cooking contest with a different food theme each episode. The original cast would also return with the exception of Ham Yeon-ji. The first episode aired on January 15, 2021.

The show was cancelled by MBC in May 2021 due to poor viewer ratings. The final episode aired on June 4, 2021.

Episodes
 – Golden Axe 
 – Toad

(2021)

Ratings 
 – Highest rating 
 – Lowest rating

(2021)

Notes

References

External links
  
 

South Korean reality television series
South Korean cooking television series
2021 South Korean television series debuts
South Korean variety television shows
South Korean game shows